French-Canadian electro-funk duo Chromeo has released five studio albums, three mix albums, one extended play, 30 singles (including six as a featured artist) and 18 music videos.

Albums

Studio albums

Compilation albums

Live albums

Mix albums

Extended plays

Singles

As lead artist

As featured artist

Guest appearances

Remixes

Music videos

Notes

References

External links
 
 
 
 

Discographies of Canadian artists
Electronic music discographies